"Maybe I Mean Yes" is a song by American country music singer Holly Dunn. It was a new song from her 1991 compilation Milestones: Greatest Hits, from which it was released as a single in 1991. Dunn wrote and produced the song with her brother Chris Waters. The song was withdrawn from airplay at Dunn's request, just weeks after its release and while climbing the Billboard Hot Country Songs chart, due to controversy over the song's lyrics.

Content
Written by Dunn along with her brother Chris Waters and songwriter Tom Shapiro, the song is about a flirtatious woman. Dunn herself described the song as a "lighthearted look at one couple's attempt at dating, handled in an innocent, nonsexual, flirtatious way."

Critical reception
Kimmy Wix of Cash Box wrote that the song "drives her scorching vocals to an all-time-high performance" and that it "also ranks high on the list with commanding lyrics, spicy instrumentation and a barreling tempo that conjures up a musical storm."

Controversy
The song was the subject of controversy at the time of its release concerning the lyric "When I say 'no' I mean 'maybe', or maybe I mean 'yes'." Due to negative feedback from listeners who perceived this lyric as condoning date rape, Dunn sent letters to radio stations and television stations, asking for the single to be withdrawn from rotation. Dunn also stated that "My co-writers and I stand by our original intent 100%." Dunn also agreed to stop performing the song in concert.

Chart performance
The song peaked at No. 48 on the Hot Country Songs chart dated August 10, 1991, after only five weeks on the charts. Despite Dunn's decision to withdraw the song having already been enacted, it increased in airplay for that week, rising from the No. 53 position.

References

1991 singles
1991 songs
Holly Dunn songs
Songs written by Holly Dunn
Songs written by Chris Waters
Songs written by Tom Shapiro
Warner Records singles
Obscenity controversies in music